Kock is a surname literally meaning "cook" in some languages. Notable people with this surname include:
Annuar Kock, Aruban footballer
Axel Kock, Swedish philologist
Elrich Kock, South African rugby union player
Elsebeth Kock-Petersen, Danish politician
Henry Kock (1952 – December 25, 2005) was a noted horticulturist, eco-activist, and founder of the Elm Recovery Project in Ontario
Johan Kock (1861–1951), Finnish soldier, revolutionary and businessman
Karin Kock-Lindberg, Swedish politician
Kristina Kock
Ned Kock, Brazilian-American philosopher
Nils Kock, surgeon, the namesake of the Kock pouch
Osmo Kock
Putte Kock (1901–1979), Swedish sportsman
Theodor Kock (1820–1901), biologist, the namesake of Kock's mouse-eared bat
Ulla Kock am Brink, German TV presenter
Vera Kock (born 17 May 1952) is a Swedish former swimmer
Winston Kock (1909–1982) was the first Director of NASA Electronics Research Center (NASA ERC) in Cambridge, Massachusetts